Samuel Pettigrew served as Mayor of Pittsburgh from 1832 to 1836, his administration was marked by the industrialization of the city.  Pittsburgh celebrated its newfound might by christening the first steam locomotive in the mid-west aptly named "The Pittsburgh".  Mayor Pettigrew contended with one of the city's first major disasters when a flood crested at 38.2 feet in February 1832.  He was also both the last Pittsburgh mayor appointed by City Council and the first Pittsburgh mayor to win a general election outright by all the city's citizens.

Pettigrew married Martha Barclay in 1814, and she died in 1823. He married Charlotte Clayland in 1824. He died in 1841.

See also

 List of mayors of Pittsburgh

References

1841 deaths
Mayors of Pittsburgh
Year of birth unknown